Bismillah Airlines (BML) is a cargo airline based in Bangladesh. It is the first international cargo carrier of Bangladesh.

History 
Bismillah Airlines was launched in 1998. It is the property of the Mollah Group of Industries. Bismillah Airlines is the first international cargo carrier in Bangladesh. In 1999, BML launched a commercial route between Bangkok and Dhaka with a Boeing 707.

In 2009, the Mollah Group opened the Bismillah Flying School, the first private flying school in the country. In 2010, Bismillah Airlines exported 120,000 tons worth of cargo goods, and imported 75,000 tons.

As of September 2015, Bismillah Airlines did not seem to have any active aircraft, but two Antonov An-148s were planned. In 2016, it expanded its cargo operations to the Hong Kong Airport.

Fleet

Current fleet

The Bismillah Airlines fleet included (as of November 2018):

Historical fleet
The airline also operated the following aircraft which have since been retired:

  1 Antonov An-8  
  3 Antonov AN-12  
  1 Antonov AN-26  
  1 Boeing 707
  1 Boeing 727
  2 Boeing 737
  2 Boeing 747  
  1 Douglas DC-8 
  2 Hawker Siddeley HS 748  
  1 Ilyushin IL-18
  1 Ilyushin IL-76
  1 Ilyushin IL-96
  2 Lockheed L-1011 TriStar

See also
 List of airlines of Bangladesh

References

External links

Official website

Airlines of Bangladesh
Airlines established in 1998
Cargo airlines of Bangladesh
Bangladeshi companies established in 1998